The Nurturer is an album by pianist Geri Allen recorded in 1990 and released on the Blue Note label.

Reception 

AllMusic's Scott Yanow awarded the album 4½ stars, calling it "A fine example of Geri Allen's advanced music (which holds on to tradition without merely recreating the past)".

The authors of the Penguin Guide to Jazz Recordings wrote: "With The Nurturer, Allen develops her interest in structures, the shape and resonance of compositions, as opposed to straightforward soloing on themes. The arrangements are watertight and quite ambitious... Strongly recommended."

Track listing
All compositions by Geri Allen except as indicated
 "Night's Shadow" (Eli Fountain) - 8:26
 "No. 3" (Lawrence Williams) - 8:17
 "It's Good To Be Home Again" (Williams) - 4:32
 "Batista's Groove" (Marcus Belgrave) - 5:24
 "Night of Power (For My Daughter Laila)" - 2:19
 "Our Gang" (Robert Hurst) - 5:38
 "Silence and Song/The Nurturer" - 9:51
 "Le Goo Wop" - 1:48
 "Lullaby of Isfahn" (Kenny Garrett) - 6:41

Personnel 
 Geri Allen - piano
 Marcus Belgrave - trumpet, flugelhorn
 Kenny Garrett - alto saxophone 
 Robert Hurst - bass 
 Jeff "Tain" Watts - drums
 Eli Fountain - percussion

References 

1991 albums
Geri Allen albums
Blue Note Records albums
Instrumental albums